Namwirye station is an infill railway station on Line 8 of the Seoul Metropolitan Subway system. It opened on December 18, 2021. This station was constructed for Wirye New Town, but it is not located inside of Wirye.

Namwirye is also the only station of Line 8 on above ground.

Station layout

References

Railway stations opened in 2021
Seoul Metropolitan Subway stations
Metro stations in Seongnam